NA-112 Nankana Sahib-II is a constituency for the National Assembly of Pakistan.

Area
During the delimitation of 2018, NA-118 Nankana Sahib-II acquired areas from three former constituencies namely NA-132 (Sheikhupura-II-cum-Nankana Sahib), NA-136 (Nankana Sahib-II-cum-Sheikhupura), and NA-137 (Nankana Sahib-III), the areas of Nankana Sahib District which are part of this constituency are listed below alongside the former constituency name from which they were acquired:

Areas acquired from NA-132 (Sheikhupura-II-cum-Nankana Sahib)
Following areas of Nankana Sahib Tehsil
Jawahar Pur (excluding Mauza Madhodas)
Mirza Pur

Areas acquired from NA-136 Nankana Sahib-II-cum-Sheikhupura
Following areas of Nankana Sahib Tehsil
Mangtanwala
Rehanwala (excluding Mirzapur and Jawahar Pur except Mauza Madhodas)
Asalapar
Jalal Nau
Chak No. 589/GB
Bulaqi
Murtaza (excluding Mauza Naranwala)

Areas acquired from NA-137 Nankana Sahib-III
Nankana Sahib Municipal Corporation
Rest of Nankana Sahib Tehsil (excluding what is mentioned above and the areas included in NA-117 (Nankana Sahib-I) such as Mohlan, Warburton, Municipal Committee Warburton, Chak No. 370/GB, Chak No. 572/GB, and Chak No. 574/GB)

Members of Parliament

2018-2022: NA-118 Nankana Sahib-II

Election 2002 

General elections were held on 10 Oct 2002. Rai Mansab Ali Khan of PML-Q won by 61,506 votes.

Election 2008 

General elections were held on 18 Feb 2008. Saeed Ahmed Zafar an Independent candidate won by 54,732 votes.

Election 2013 

General elections were held on 11 May 2013. Rai Mansab Ali Khan of PML-N won by 61,329 votes and became the  member of National Assembly.

Election 2018 

General elections were held on 25 July 2018.

By-election 2022 
A by-election was held on 16 October 2022 due to the resignation of Ijaz Shah, the previous MNA from this seat.

By-election 2023 
A by-election will be held on 30 April 2023 due to the vacation of this seat by Imran Khan, who won it in the 2022 by-election.

See also
NA-111 Nankana Sahib-I
NA-113 Sheikhupura-I

References

External links 
 Election result's official website

NA-137